III Brigade, Royal Horse Artillery (Territorial Force), along with its sister IV Brigade, Royal Horse Artillery (T.F.), was a Royal Horse Artillery brigade of the Territorial Force that was formed in Egypt in April 1916 for the ANZAC Mounted Division.

Both brigades served with the ANZAC Mounted Division during the Sinai and Palestine Campaign of World War I.  In July 1917, the division's artillery was reorganized and the brigade headquarters were dissolved.

History

Formation
The ANZAC Mounted Division was formed in Egypt in March 1916 with four cavalry brigades, each of three regiments: the Australian 1st, 2nd and 3rd Light Horse Brigades and the New Zealand Mounted Rifles Brigade.  Four British Territorial Force horse artillery batteries were assigned to the division to provide artillery support, one per brigade.

III Brigade, Royal Horse Artillery (Territorial Force) was formed in April 1916 in the Egyptian Expeditionary Force for the division with
Leicestershire Battery, RHA (T.F.)
Somerset Battery, RHA (T.F.)
The batteries had been assigned to the North Midland and 2nd South Western Mounted Brigades, respectively, at the outbreak of the war, each equipped with four Ehrhardt 15-pounder guns.  The batteries had arrived in Egypt independently; Leicestershire RHA landed at Alexandria on 25 February 1916.

In practice, the batteries were permanently attached to the mounted brigades: Leicestershire RHA to the 1st Light Horse Brigade and Somerset RHA to the 2nd Light Horse Brigade.

Active service

The brigade, and its batteries, served with the ANZAC Mounted Division in the Sinai and Palestine Campaign until July 1917.  With the division, it saw action at the Battle of Romani (414 August 1916) as part of No. 3 Section, Suez Canal Defences.  This saw the repulse of the final Turkish attempt to cut the Suez Canal.

The division then joined the Desert Column and with it took part in the advance across the Sinai.  It fought at the Battle of Magdhaba (23 December 1916) and the Battle of Rafah (9 January 1917).  The batteries were then re-equipped with four 18 pounders each.  They then took part in the First (2627 March 1917) and Second Battles of Gaza (1719 April 1917).

Reorganised
Leicestershire RHA departed on 20 June 1917 for the Yeomanry Mounted Division.  It formed part of XX Brigade, Royal Horse Artillery (T.F.) from 5 July.

In July 1917, the artillery of the ANZAC Mounted Division was reorganized.  A new headquarters, XVIII Brigade, Royal Horse Artillery (T.F.), was formed for the division and took command of Somerset RHA.  It was joined by Inverness-shire and Ayrshire RHA of IV Brigade, RHA (T.F.).  With the departure of its batteries, III Brigade was dissolved.

See also

Notes

References

Bibliography

External links
The Royal Horse Artillery on The Long, Long Trail
The Great War Royal Horse Artillery

Royal Horse Artillery brigades
Artillery units and formations of World War I
Military units and formations established in 1916
Military units and formations disestablished in 1917